Delyow Derow (Cornish: Oak Leaves) was a literary magazine in Cornish, published from 1988 to 1996 by former Grand Bard of Gorseth Kernow Richard Jenkin. Printed in Robert Morton Nance's Unified Cornish orthography, it published a number of new writers as well as providing a platform for established poets and authors.

References

Mass media in Cornwall
Cornish language
Cornish culture
Defunct literary magazines published in the United Kingdom
Magazines established in 1988
Magazines disestablished in 1996